The 2002 U.S. House of Representatives election for the state of North Dakota's at-large congressional district was held November 5, 2002. The incumbent, Democratic-NPL Congressman Earl Pomeroy was re-elected to his sixth term, defeating Republican candidate Rick Clayburgh.

Only Pomeroy filed as a Dem-NPLer, and the endorsed Republican candidate was Rick Clayburgh, who was serving as the North Dakota State Tax Commissioner. Pomeroy and Clayburgh won the primary elections for their respective parties.

The election was the closest for Pomeroy in all of his career as congressman until his defeat in 2010; he won by just over 11,000 votes. This was because Clayburgh ran an aggressive campaign, and was the most well-known candidate ever to face Pomeroy; he had held a statewide office for 8 years. United States Vice President Dick Cheney campaigned for Clayburgh in Fargo, North Dakota on July 29.

Election results

References

See also

2002
North Dakota
2002 North Dakota elections